Events during the year 1101 in Italy.

Deaths
 Roger I of Sicily
 Walter of Albano
 Anselm IV (archbishop of Milan)

Sources
 
 
 
 
 
 
 
Landolfo Iuniore di San Paolo. Historia Mediolanensis.
Ghisalberti, Alberto M. Dizionario Biografico degli Italiani: III Ammirato – Arcoleo. Rome, 1961.

References

Years of the 12th century in Italy
Italy
Italy